Stefan Edberg and Anders Järryd were the defending champions, but lost in the second round.

Kevin Curren and Jim Grabb won the title, defeating Paul Annacone and John Fitzgerald 7–5, 6–4 in the final.

Seeds

Draw

Finals

Top half

Bottom half

References
Draw

Stockholm Open
1988 Grand Prix (tennis)